The Flight to France (1887) is an adventure novel written by Jules Verne about a fictional French Army Captain Natalis Delpierre, with a setting in the year 1792 just before the French Revolutionary Wars. Several English language editions were published with the subtitle, The Flight to France; or, The Memoirs of a Dragoon. A Tale of the Day of Dumouriez.

Publication history
1888, UK, London: Sampson Low, Marston, Searle, & Rivington, 231 pp., First UK edition
1889, USA, New York: New York, G. Munro, 158 pp., First United States edition

References

External links

 Le Chemin de France available at Jules Verne Collection 

1887 French novels
Novels by Jules Verne